John Becker may refer to:

John J. Becker (1886–1961), American composer
John Becker (writer), writer based in the Washington, D.C. area
John Becker (basketball) (born 1968), head coach of the University of Vermont men's basketball team
John Becker (politician), member of the Ohio House of Representatives
John Becker, fictional character from the TV series Becker